is a Japanese manga series written and illustrated by Mari Okazaki. It was published by Shodensha's josei manga magazine Feel Young from October 8, 2003, to November 7, 2009; a sidestory also ran in the magazine in 2010. It has been collected in seven volumes so far, and was published in English by Tokyopop who released five volumes in English. Suppli was adapted into a Japanese drama series which aired in Japan on Fuji TV in summer 2006.  It stars Misaki Itō, Kazuya Kamenashi, Eita, and Miho Shiraishi.

Minami is a 27-year-old female office worker in an advertisement agency. Though she has a boyfriend, she spends the majority of her time working and appears to feel ambivalent about the relationship at best. When the boyfriend finally breaks up with her, it's the push she needs to start a social life with her co-workers. In-office romances soon follow. Much of the story is told through Minami's thoughts, which are full of self-doubt.

Cast
 Minami Fuji – Misaki Itoh
 Yuya Ishida – Kazuya Kamenashi
 Satoshi Ogiwara – Eita
 Yoko Yugi – Miho Shiraishi
 Kunio Sakuragi – Kazuyuki Aijima
 Yuri Watanabe – Reina Asami
 Yoshihide Matsui – 
 Keisuke Mita – Shigeyuki Sato
 Natsuki Konno – Mirai Shida
 Mizuho Tanaka – Ryo
 Kyotaro Imaoka – Kōichi Satō

Minor cast
 Konishiki in episode 1
 Nozomi Saito – Naomi Akimoto in episode 2
 Masako Umemiya in episode 4
 Shin Yanase – Mantaro Koichi in episode 5
 Mika Kazuki – Sayo Aizawa in episode 5
 Yumiko Hirano – Megumi Yokoyama in episode 7
  in episode 8
 Shinshou Nakamaru in episode 10
  in episode 10
 Seiji Rokkaku in episode 11

Reception
Suppli is regarded as being more realistic in its depiction of working life than Tramps Like Us or Happy Mania. Deb Aoki of About.com called it "refreshingly real", in contrast to shōjo manga stories. Nadia Oxford of Mania Entertainment regarded the first volume as being a "fairly standard romance novel" in manga format. Margaret O'Connell, writing for Sequential Tart, described Minami as suffering from "internalized misogyny", noting that she has no female support network.

Notes

References

2006 Japanese television series debuts
2006 Japanese television series endings
Fuji TV dramas
Japanese drama television series
Josei manga
Shodensha franchises
Shodensha manga
Tokyopop titles